The 2016–17 TFF First League, also known as PTT First League due to sponsoring reasons, was the 16th season since the league was established in 2001 and 54th season of the second-level football league of Turkey since its establishment in 1963–64.

Teams 
Sivasspor, Eskişehirspor and Mersin İdmanyurdu relegated from 2015–16 Süper Lig.
Adanaspor, Kardemir Karabükspor and Alanyaspor promoted to 2016–17 Süper Lig.
Ümraniyespor, Manisaspor and Bandırmaspor promoted from 2015–16 TFF Second League.
1461 Trabzon, Kayseri Erciyesspor and Karşıyaka relegated to 2016–17 TFF Second League.

Stadia and locations

League table

Results

Promotion Playoffs

Semifinals

Final

See also 
 2016–17 Turkish Cup
 2016–17 Süper Lig
 2016–17 TFF Second League
 2016–17 TFF Third League

References

External links 
  Turkish Football Federation PTT 1. League

TFF First League seasons
Turkey
2016–17 in Turkish football